Metagylla is a genus of moths in the subfamily Arctiinae. It contains the single species Metagylla miroides, which is found in French Guiana.

References

Natural History Museum Lepidoptera generic names catalog

Lithosiini
Noctuoidea genera
Moths of South America
Monotypic moth genera
Moths described in 1907